Modern Convent School  Sector 4, Dwarka, New Delhi.

Established in 1999,  Modern Convent is a CBSE co-educational institution. It follows the NCERT curriculum to prepare students for the All India Secondary School Examination (Class X) and All India Senior School Certificate Examination (Class XII).

The school has nearly 3400 students on its rolls with a staff of around 120 and offers education to students from Nursery to Class XII.

A choice of subjects in all streams gives student the freedom to pursue their academic interest be it Science, Commerce or Humanities. The campus is equipped with library, laboratories, basketball court, football court, volleyball court, Karate Ground and more. For interscholastic competitions, the school has four houses namely: Ashok, Subhash, Tagore and Tilak, named after the respective Indian historical figures.

References

External links
Official Website

Schools in Delhi
Educational institutions established in 1999
South West Delhi district
1999 establishments in Delhi